The JAC Refine M5 (瑞風, Ruifeng M5) is a light commercial, 4-door van built by the JAC Motors in China since 2002. The Refine M5 marked the starting point of the Refine sub-brand under JAC, with the van originally being called the JAC Refine MPV, Refine I, and Refine M1. The original first generation model is a rebadge model based on the first generation Hyundai Starex, with the post-facelift model starting to differentiate from the Hyundai van styling wise. The second generation was launched in April 2011 originally as the Refine II Hechang. In late 2012, the name was changed to Refine M5 to sit under the Refine MPV series.

First generation (2002–2015) 

The first generation Refine M5 MPV started out as a rebadged first generation Hyundai Starex due to the joint venture between Hyundai and JAC Motors with JAC building rebadged Hyundai Starexs under license in March 2002. The original name at launch was simply JAC Refine, later, the model was renamed to Refine M5 as a car of the luxury Refine series of JAC Motors.

As of 2013, the Refine MPV is offered in three trim levels, from low to high is the Chuansuo, Xianghe, and M5 series. The M5 is the top of the trim model and was developed as the second generation Refine, with the name later being officially the Refine M5.

The Refine MPV is offered with several engine options. A 2.0 liter HFC4GA3-1B inline-4 16V DOHC engine mated to either a 4-speed automatic transmission or a 5-speed manual transmission. A 2.4 liter HFC4GA1-B inline-4 16V DOHC engine mated to a 5-speed manual transmission. A 2.0 liter HFC4GA3-B inline-4 16V DOHC engine mated to a 5-speed manual transmission. A 2.0 liter HFC4GA1-2B inline-4 16V DOHC engine mated to a 5-speed manual transmission. A 2.8 liter HFC4DA1-2B1 inline-4 8V SOHC diesel engine mated to a 5-speed manual transmission.

Facelift
A facelift was conducted on the Hyundai-Starex-based Refine MPV, with the front DRG still being visually similar to the post-facelift first generation Starex while featuring a independently developed rear end design, replacing the tail lamps, tail gate, and rear bumper. In the first few years of its introduction, the M5 (second generation Refine MPV) was sold alongside its predecessor.

Second generation (2011–present) 

The second generation Refine MPV (Refine II) or Refine M5 MPV debuted as a concept named the JAC Refine IV at the 2010 Beijing Auto Show. The production car debuted at the 2011 Shanghai Auto Show in April 2011. The power of the Refine M5 comes from a 2.0 liter engine producing 177hp and 260nm. After the establishment of the Refine luxury series, the JAC Refine MPV was renamed to Refine M5, positioning it between the Refine M4 and Refine M6 MPVs within a long line of products. The second generation Refine M5 MPV was priced from 139,500 to 166,500 yuan.

References

External links

M5
Minivans
Minibuses
Rear-wheel-drive vehicles
Cars of China
Cars introduced in 2002